The Letord Let.5 was probably the most numerous of a family of 3-seat reconnaissance bombers, designed and built in France from 1916, originally to an A3 (reconnaissance aircraft 3-seat) specification from the STAé (Service Technique d'Aéronautique).

Design and development
In early 1916 the contemporary reconnaissance aircraft of the Aéronautique Militaire, such as the Caudron G.6, Morane-Saulnier T and Salmson-Moineau SM.1 were proving to be less than sparkling in operations and testing. To provide a suitable replacement The STAé, its Director Colonel Dorand and Établissements Letord, formulated the A3 specification and co-operated in the design of the only respondent, the Letord Let.1.

The Letord A3 reconnaissance bomber family, the Let.1 to Let.7, were essentially similar biplanes with, variously unequal span or equal span wings, with prominent and characteristic negative stagger on their wings, powered by two tractor engines in nacelles mounted short struts or directly on the lower wings and had a fixed tailskid undercarriage. Some aircraft were equipped with a strut-mounted nosewheel to protect the aircraft and its crew from "nosing-over" accidents while landing. The pilot sat in an open cockpit under the upper wing trailing edge, with a gunner in an open position immediately aft, and a third crew-member in an open position in the nose where he could act as gunner, observer, and bomb-aimer.

Aircraft were completed, variously, with equal span 4-bay wings or unequal span 3-bay wings with longer span upper wings braced by an A-frame king-post and wires. All the Letord reconnaissance bombers shared similar plywood covered wooden structure fuselages and wooden structure wings and conventional tail-unit.

Operational history
The Letord reconnaissance bombers saw widespread service throughout the Aéronautique Militaire, from mid 1917, with 121 operational on the Western Front by November 1917. Most were no longer in front-line use by the Armistice in November 1918.

Variants

Let.1 A.3
initial reconnaissance version, powered by two  Hispano-Suiza 8A engines and having a three bay wing.
Let.2 A.3
reconnaissance aircraft similar to Let.1, but powered by two  Hispano-Suiza 8Ba engines and also having a three bay wing.
Let.3 Bn.3
night bomber, powered by two  Hispano-Suiza 8Ba engines and having a four bay wing.
Let.4 A.3
reconnaissance aircraft also used as a bomber, powered by two  Lorraine-Dietrich 8A engines and having a three bay wing.
Let.5 A.3
reconnaissance aircraft powered by two  Lorraine-Dietrich 8B engines, having a three bay wing and missing the nosewheel.
Let.6 Ca.3
fighter based on the Let.3, armed with a  cannon, powered by two  Hispano-Suiza 8Be engines and fitted with a four bay wing.
Let.7 Bn.3
night bomber, powered by two  Lorraine-Dietrich 8B engines and fitted with a four bay wing of increased span.

Operators

Aéronautique Militaire

Specifications (Let.5)

See also

References

Bibliography

Further reading

External links

1910s French military reconnaissance aircraft
1910s French bomber aircraft
Letord aircraft
Biplanes with negative stagger
Aircraft first flown in 1916
Twin piston-engined tractor aircraft